Fragata is a surname. Notable people with the surname include:

Fernando Fragata, Portuguese film director
Gaspar Fragata (born 1972), Angolan swimmer